Tara Township may refer to the following townships in the U.S. state of Minnesota:
Tara Township, Swift County, Minnesota
Tara Township, Traverse County, Minnesota

Minnesota township disambiguation pages